James Fearnley (born 9 October 1954, in Worsley) is an English musician. He played accordion in the Celtic punk band The Pogues.

Life and career
As a child he was a choir treble before his voice changed at the age of sixteen. He took piano lessons but did not enjoy it, so he chose to learn the guitar instead. He played with the singer Nik Wade and later with a group called The Mixers, a band based in Teddington. Fearnley became the guitarist in the last edition of Shane MacGowan's band The Nipple Erectors.

The group then consisted of Shane MacGowan on vocals, Shanne Bradley on bass and Jon Moss on drums. When The Nips disbanded at the end of 1980, Fearnley joined the soul band The Giants. Fearnley was asked by Moss if he wanted to become a permanent member of a band in which he sometimes played, Culture Club. Due to a misunderstanding, Fearnley never joined Culture Club, and shortly after this the band went on to fame.

Fearnley sold his guitar and spent a year writing a novel. In 1982, MacGowan and Jem Finer were seeking an accordion player for their latest project, The Pogues. MacGowan knew that Fearnley had taken piano lessons and believed that he may have been able to play the accordion too. Finer turned up at Fearnley's flat with an accordion in a laundry bag and persuaded him to give it a try. Fearnley was nicknamed 'maestro' because he could tune the instruments. Thus, he joined The Pogues, with whom he played for many years.

In 1989, he married actress Danielle von Zerneck and moved to Los Angeles, California. He and Danielle have two daughters Martha and Irene. Fearnley left The Pogues in 1994 due to the band's heavy touring schedule, to spend more time with his family. He rejoined the band following its reunion in 2001.

He was a founding member of The Low And Sweet Orchestra, which released their debut album of Spaghetti Western-styled ballads Goodbye To All That in 1996. This group consisted of former Thelonious Monster vocalist Mike Martt, Circle Jerks' Zander Schloss (guitar), the brothers Kieran and Dermot Mulroney (violins, cello, dobro), Tom Barta (bass) and Will Hughes (drums).

Fearnley has appeared as a guest musician on albums with Talking Heads (Naked), David Byrne, Julia Fordham, Steve Earle, Dylan Walshe and Melissa Etheridge (Yes I Am) among other.

In 1995 he wrote the score for the film, God's Lonely Man.

Fearnley plays accordion, guitar, foot-operated snare drum and sings with Cranky George, 'a band of one-man-bands' with Dermot Mulroney (cello, guitar, mandolin, foot-operated cymbal and hi-hat, and vocals), Kieran Mulroney (violin, ukuleles, guitars, foot-operated cowbell) and Brad Wood (bass, hat-box bass-drum and vocals) and Sebastian Sheehan (percussion).

On 12 January 2012, he released his first single "Hey Ho". It was recorded with John King of Dust Brothers.

The first volume of his memoirs, Here Comes Everybody: The Story of the Pogues was published by Faber and Faber on 19 April 2012 in the UK.

In June 2019 Fearnley, alongside Flogging Molly's Ted Hutt and Marc Orrell of Dropkick Murphys announced the formation of a new supergroup, The Walker Roaders. The Walker Roaders' debut record was released on 23 August 2019.

References

1954 births
20th-century English male musicians
21st-century English male musicians
20th-century British guitarists
21st-century British guitarists
20th-century accordionists
21st-century accordionists
21st-century English memoirists
People from Worsley
People from Salford
People educated at Ackworth School
English folk musicians
English punk rock musicians
Living people
The Pogues members
The Nipple Erectors members